Jennifer or Jenny Smith may refer to:

Jennifer Smith (actress), plays Lavender Brown in the Harry Potter films
Jennifer Smith (basketball) (born 1982), American basketball player
Jennifer Smith (General Hospital), a character on the American soap opera, General Hospital
Jennifer Smith (sociolinguist), Scottish professor
Jennifer Smith (soprano) (born 1945), Portuguese soprano
Jennifer E. Smith (born 1980), American author
 Jennifer Smith (scientist) (born 1972)
Jennifer Elaine Smith, American behavioral ecologist and evolutionary biologist
Jennifer M. Smith (born 1947), former premier of Bermuda
Jennifer Schwalbach Smith (born 1971), American actress and wife of Kevin Smith
Jenny Smith (gymnast) (born 1980), Australian Olympic gymnast
Jenny Lee Smith (born 1948), English golfer

See also
Jenn Smith (born 1998), Canadian curler
Jenna Smith (born 1988), American basketball player